Television in the Bahamas was introduced in 1977, though television broadcasts had already been available from the United States for several decades.
The television stations in the Bahamas include:

ZNS-13, Nassau/Freeport
 JCN Channel 14
 Our TV
 Eyewitness News

See also
List of newspapers in the Bahamas
List of the Caribbean television channels

References 

 

Society of the Bahamas